Tairāwhiti or Tai Rawhiti may refer to:

Te Tai Rāwhiti, the customary Māori name for the Gisborne Region
A District health board of New Zealand in that region
 Te Tai Rawhiti, a former New Zealand parliamentary Māori electorate
Te Pīhopatanga o Te Tairāwhiti, a Māori bishopric of the Anglican Church in Aotearoa, New Zealand and Polynesia.
The Gisborne Tairawhiti rugby league team